Arabian Waltz is an album by the Lebanese oud player and composer Rabih Abou-Khalil, featuring the Balanescu Quartet, which was recorded in 1995 and released on the Enja label the following year.

Reception

The Allmusic review by Kurt Keefner called it "the pinnacle of Rabih Abou-Khalil's achievement as a composer and arranger" and stated "It is a sublime fusion of jazz, Middle Eastern traditional music, and Western classical ... This recording suits every fan of world music, jazz, classical, or just good music".

Track listing
All compositions by Rabih Abou-Khalil
 "Arabian Waltz" – 8:10
 "Dreams of a Dying City" – 12:08
 "Ornette Never Sleeps" – 6:58
 "Georgina" – 11:09
 "No Visa" – 9:59
 "The Pain After" – 9:26

Personnel
Rabih Abou-Khalil – oud
Michel Godard – tuba, serpent
Nabil Khaiat – frame drums
Balanescu Quartet:
Alexander Bălănescu – violin
Clare Connors – violin
Paul Martin – viola
David Cunliffe – violincello

References

Rabih Abou-Khalil albums
1996 albums
Enja Records albums